Petit-Failly is a commune in the Meurthe-et-Moselle department in north-eastern France.

Geography
The village lies on the right bank of the Othain, which flows northward through the western part of the commune.

See also
Communes of the Meurthe-et-Moselle department

References

Petitfailly